An election to South Pembrokeshire District Council was held in May 1979. An Independent majority was maintained. It was preceded by the 1976  election and followed by the 1983 election. On the same day there was a United Kingdom General Election and were elections to the other local authorities and community councils in Wales.

Results

Amroth (one seat)

Angle (one seat)

Begelly (one seat)

Carew (one seat)

Cosheston(one seat)

Hundleton (one seat)

Lampeter Velfrey (one seat)

Maenclochog (one seat)

Manorbier(one seat)

Martletwy and Slebech (one seat)

Narberth North / South (one seat)

Narberth Urban (one seat)

Pembroke Central (two seats)

Pembroke East (three seats)

Pembroke Llanion (two seats)

Pembroke Market (two seats)

Pembroke Pennar (two seats)

Penally(one seat)

St Issels (two seats)

Tenby North (two seats)

Tenby South (two seats)

References

1979
1979 Welsh local elections